The 1987 Winter Universiade, the XIII Winter Universiade, took place in Štrbské Pleso, Czechoslovakia.

Medal table

References

1987
Universiade
U
Winter Universiade
Multi-sport events in Czechoslovakia
Sport in Prešov Region
February 1987 sports events in Europe
Winter sports competitions in Czechoslovakia